Karolína Grohová (born 21 November 1990 in Dvůr Králové nad Labem) is a Czech cross-country skier.

Grohová competed at the 2014 Winter Olympics for the Czech Republic. She placed 38th in the qualifying round in the sprint, failing to advance to the knockout stages. She also competed with Eva Vrabcová-Nývltová, Petra Nováková and Klára Moravcová in the relay, finishing 10th.

As of April 2014, her best showing at the World Championships is 12th, in the relay in 2013. Her best individual finish is 34th, in the 2013 individual sprint.

Grohová made her World Cup debut in January 2011. As of April 2014, her best finish is 15th, in a classical team sprint race at Asiago in 2013–14. Her best individual finish is 28th, in a freestyle sprint at Lenzerheide in the 2013–14 Tour de Ski. Her best World Cup overall finish is 111th, in 2013–14. Her best World Cup finish in a discipline is 72nd, in the 2013-14 sprint.

Cross-country skiing results
All results are sourced from the International Ski Federation (FIS).

Olympic Games

World Championships

World Cup

References

External links

1990 births
Living people
Olympic cross-country skiers of the Czech Republic
Cross-country skiers at the 2014 Winter Olympics
Cross-country skiers at the 2018 Winter Olympics
People from Dvůr Králové nad Labem
Czech female cross-country skiers
Universiade bronze medalists for the Czech Republic
Universiade medalists in cross-country skiing
Competitors at the 2015 Winter Universiade
Sportspeople from the Hradec Králové Region